The 2022 season saw Western Storm compete in the 50 over Rachael Heyhoe Flint Trophy and the Twenty20 Charlotte Edwards Cup. In the Charlotte Edwards Cup, the side won three of their six matches, finishing third in Group A. In the Rachael Heyhoe Flint Trophy, the side finished fourth in the group, winning three of their seven matches.

The side was captained by Sophie Luff. After the departure of Mark O'Leary as coach at the start of the season, the side was coached on an interim basis by Dan Helesfay during the Charlotte Edwards Cup, before Trevor Griffin took up the position on a permanent basis starting with the Rachael Heyhoe Flint Trophy. They played two home matches at the County Ground, two at the County Ground, Bristol, one at Sophia Gardens and one at College Ground, Cheltenham.

Squad

Changes
On 25 November 2021, it was announced that Fran Wilson had signed for the side from Sunrisers. Wilson had previously played for Storm between 2016 and 2019 in the Women's Cricket Super League. On 16 February 2022, it was announced that Mark O'Leary was stepping down from his role as Head Coach. On 27 April 2022, it was announced that Anya Shrubsole had left the side, joining Southern Vipers in a player-coach role. On 11 May 2022, the side announced their 17-player squad for the upcoming season: compared to the previous year, Sophia Smale was added, and Emma Corney, Emily Edgcombe, Steph Hutchins, Joleigh Roberts and Chloe Skelton were removed. On 17 May 2022, it was announced that Dan Helesfay would be interim Head Coach for the Charlotte Edwards Cup, with Trevor Griffin, coach of the side between 2017 and 2019, returning to the position on a permanent basis from the Rachael Heyhoe Flint Trophy onwards. Chloe Skelton returned to the full squad to play a match in the Rachael Heyhoe Flint Trophy on 9 July. Emma Corney returned to the full squad to play a match in the Rachael Heyhoe Flint Trophy on 11 September. Emily Geach and Katie Jones were added to the full squad on 17 September 2022.

Squad list
 Age given is at the start of Western Storm's first match of the season (14 May 2022).

Charlotte Edwards Cup

Group A

 advanced to the semi-final

Fixtures

Tournament statistics

Batting

Source: ESPN Cricinfo Qualification: 50 runs.

Bowling

Source: ESPN Cricinfo Qualification: 5 wickets.

Rachael Heyhoe Flint Trophy

Season standings

 advanced to final
 advanced to the play-off

Fixtures

Tournament statistics

Batting

Source: ESPN Cricinfo Qualification: 100 runs.

Bowling

Source: ESPN Cricinfo Qualification: 5 wickets.

Season statistics

Batting

Bowling

Fielding

Wicket-keeping

References

Western Storm seasons
2022 in English women's cricket